The Road is the seventh studio album by Mike + The Mechanics, released in 2011 by Sony Music. This was their first album to feature an entirely new lineup, retaining only Mike Rutherford .

Following the release of Rewired in 2004 and the supporting tour, the group stopped working. In 2009, rumours surfaced that Mike Rutherford had plans to resurrect the band and had begun working on a new album. It was reported that Andrew Roachford would become the new singer. Soon after, two other names were mentioned: Arno Carstens and Tim Howar. Early sessions produced the songs "Background Noise", "It Only Hurts for a While" and "Hunt You Down", with Carstens performing vocals.

The sessions continued through 2010. By the end of 2010, it was officially announced that Rutherford, Roachford and Howar had recorded a new Mechanics album. The rest of the band consisted of drummer Gary Wallis, guitarist Anthony Drennan and keyboard player Luke Juby.

The album was reissued in 2017 by the band's current label BMG (former owner of Arista).

Track listing

Personnel 
Mike and The Mechanics
 Mike Rutherford – electric guitars, bass guitar, programming, backing vocals
 Tim Howar – lead vocals (6, 10), backing vocals 
 Andrew Roachford – lead vocals (1, 2, 3, 5, 8, 11), backing vocals 
 Luke Juby – keyboards
 Anthony Drennan – electric guitars
 Gary Wallis – drums

Additional personnel
 Pete Adams – Hammond organ
 Toby Chapman – keyboards
 Jamie Norton – keyboards (2, 8)
 George Hewlett – organ (9)
 Martin Sutton – programming, electric guitars
 Ben Robins – programming (3, 10)
 Harry Rutherford – programming, backing noises, drums (4, 9)
 Ben Weaver – electric guitars (2), bass guitar (8)
 Jamie Moses – electric guitars (3)
 Hugo Flower – guitars (9)
 Arno Carstens – lead vocals (4, 7, 9), backing noises
 Beverley Brown – backing vocals
 Hazel Fernandez – backing vocals
 Christopher Neil – backing vocals 
 Mary Pearce – backing vocals
 Barrow Hills School Choir – backing vocals (6)

Production 
 Produced by Christopher Neil and Mike Rutherford (tracks 1, 3-7, 9, 10 & 11).
 Produced by Mike Rutherford and Graham Stack for Metrophonic Productions (tracks 2 & 8).
 Engineered and mixed by Harry Rutherford – all tracks
 Recorded at The Farm Studio (Chiddingford, Surrey).
 Additional recording at Churchfield Studio (London) and Tree House Studios (Cape Town, South Africa).
 Mastered by Dick Beetham at 360 Mastering (London).
 Design – Greg Jakobek
 Photography – Patrick "Paddy" Balls and Carsten Windhorst
 Management – Tony Smith

References

Mike + The Mechanics albums
2011 albums
Albums produced by Mike Rutherford
Albums produced by Christopher Neil
Arista Records albums